The Paris Evangelical Missionary Society (in French, Société des missions évangéliques de Paris), also known as the SMEP or Mission de Paris, was a Protestant missionary association created in 1822. As with other Christian societies of the era, it came under of the auspices of an organised church, in this case the Reformed Church in France and brought together Protestants of the Réveil (Awakening).

The SMEP opened several areas of operation, notably in Africa (in particular, Lesotho) and Oceania. The churches founded in these areas were organised along similar lines to the Reformed Church in France, with synods and presbyteries (consistoires)

In 1964, the daughter churches established by SMEP missionaries expressed a strong desire to change the tenor of the relationship with the mother church, for their part they wished for 'integration of the Missionary Church to the Mother Church' (l'intégration de la Mission à l'Église) This objective was realised in 1970, when two new organisations replaced the SMEP:
CÉVAA Communauté évangélique d'action apostolique (subsequently Communauté d'Églises en Mission), a federation of sister churches consisting of five Lutheran and reformed churches from France, Italy, Switzerland and those churches with their origins in the missionary work of SMEP 
DÉFAP, Département évangélique français d'action apostolique (subsequently ), a common missionary service for the five churches of the CÉVAA, with its headquarters at Maison des Missions 102, boulevard Arago, 75014 Paris, (former seat of the Paris Evangelical Missionary Society). DÉFAP continues to publish the monthly magazine Mission, the Journal des missions évangéliques, the SMEP « journal vert ».

 Bibliography 

Jean-François Zorn, Le grand siècle d’une mission protestante : la Mission de Paris, 1822-1914, Paris, Karthala, 1993, 791 p. (épuisé, en cours de ré-édition)
Jeanne-Marie Léonard, Mémoires d’évangile : les archives de la Société des missions évangéliques de Paris, 1822-1949'', Paris, Défap, 2000, 51-XXII p.

See also
 Reformed Church in France
 Huguenot

External links
 La Cévaa, communauté d'Églises en mission
 Le Défap, Service Protestant de Mission

Christian missionary societies
History of Protestantism in France
Religious organizations established in 1822
Evangelical organizations established in the 19th century
1822 establishments in France
Organizations based in Paris